Maj. Gen. Lord Stirling Quarters, also known as Homestead Farm (1880) and Echo Valley Farms (1926-1973), is a historic home located in Tredyffrin Township, Chester County, Pennsylvania. The house was built in three sections, with the oldest dated to about 1738.  The center structure is dated to 1769, and the kitchen added between 1791 and 1835.  It is a stuccoed stone dwelling with a medium gable roof.  The center section is three bays wide.  It was renovated in 1926. During the American Revolution the house served as headquarters for Major General William Alexander, Lord Stirling in late-1777 and early-1778, during the encampment at Valley Forge.

It was listed on the National Register of Historic Places in 1974.

References

Valley Forge
Houses on the National Register of Historic Places in Pennsylvania
Houses completed in 1835
Houses in Chester County, Pennsylvania
National Register of Historic Places in Chester County, Pennsylvania